John Francis Hylan (April 20, 1868January 12, 1936) was the 96th Mayor of New York City (the seventh since the consolidation of the five boroughs), from 1918 to 1925. From rural beginnings in the Catskills, Hylan eventually obtained work in Brooklyn as a laborer on the elevated railroad. During his nine years with the company, he worked his way to engineer, and also studied to earn his high school diploma. He continued by earning a law degree. He practiced law for nine years, and also participated in local Democratic politics.

In 1917 with the consent of Tammany and William Randolph Hearst, he was put forward as a Brooklyn Democratic candidate for Mayor and won the first of two terms. He was re-elected with a wide plurality, which swept many Brooklyn Democrats into office. His chief focus in office was to keep subway fares from rising. By the end of his second term, however, a report by a committee appointed by Governor Al Smith severely criticized his administration's handling of the subway system. 

Tammany ran Jimmy Walker against him for the Democratic nomination and Hylan lost. Walker appointed him to the Children's Court where he sat for many years. After his term as mayor, Hylan spent much time attacking the "interests," arguing that industrial concentration gave great power to individuals to influence politics and impoverish the working poor.

Early life
Hylan was born in 1868 in Hunter, New York, a town in upstate Greene County. He was the third child, and had two older sisters and two younger brothers. Hylan's father had emigrated from County of Cavan, Ulster, Ireland at the age of seven. He served as a corporal in the 120th New York Infantry, called the "Ulster Regiment," during the Civil War. 

Hylan's mother, who came from the Jones family upstate, had a Welsh father and a maternal grandfather, Jacob Gadron, who fought in the American Revolution among Lafayette's forces. He fondly remembered her throughout his life and wrote that the words she spoke on leaving the family ("Be honest, be truthful, be upright, and do by others as you would have them do unto you") were "indelibly imprinted on" his memory. Although his mother was Methodist, Hylan was raised a Catholic. His only surviving family, his sister Mary, died after being struck by an automobile on July 10, 1911.

Hylan's family owned a 60-acre farm in the then-undeveloped mountains and struggled to make the semi-annual interest on its $1,500 mortgage. As the oldest boy, Hylan was required to work long hours on the farm, which was not equipped with much more than hand tools. Farm work came first, the school district was impoverished, and only one family could afford the required grammar or history book, which Hylan occasionally borrowed. School lasted four to five hours a day for five months a year. In his teenage years, Hylan made extra money to help pay the mortgage interest by working each spring for the Catskill railroad, digging earth and tamping it beneath the tracks to stabilize them after the effects of winter weather.

Early career
By the winter of 1887, when he was 19, Hylan felt he could make more money for his parents by working downstate. With $3.50 and a few sets of clothes, he set off to New York, buying a $2 train ticket and then crossing the Brooklyn Bridge. On his first day he saw construction on an elevated railroad. Although he had never seen such a thing before, he climbed onto the structure and asked the foreman for a job, saying that he had worked on the Catskill railroad. He was told to report the next day, where his job was to lay rails.

Seeking a promotion, he applied at the office of the manager of the Brooklyn Union Elevated Railroad each day until he was finally granted an interview and promoted to fireman. He made $1.50 a day for this heavy labor. He reported to the East New York station on March 11, 1888, the day of the Great Blizzard. After two years as stoker, then as engine hostler, Hylan passed the required test and was given a job as an engineer, in "one of the happiest moments of [his] life." Making $3.50 a day, he said, "finally landed [him] on the right side of the engine cab." It required long hours: 13-hour runs on weekdays, 12 hours on Saturdays, and 11 on Sundays.

When Hylan felt himself economically secure, even before he became engineer, he went back to Hunter and married his childhood sweetheart Marian O'Hara. They moved to Bushwick, a section of Brooklyn where they would spend most of the rest of their lives. During his years as a motorman, he regularly paid the $75 semiannual interest payment for his family's farm and paid the principal off before he left that job. Hylan wrote that he had no inclination to seek any other position once he was settled and making $100 a month.

Hylan considered law because his younger brother, who had been studying law and on whom his parents had pinned hopes and family pride, had died. His wife encouraged him, but because of his limited education, he had to study at the Long Island Business College to prepare himself for his Regents exam before he could begin to study law. He got into law school with the help of his wife, as well as that of a teacher who gave up his lunch hour to help, and for whom Hylan later found a position in the Department of Water Supply, Gas and Electricity when he became mayor.

After he passed his Regents exam, he enrolled in New York Law School where Woodrow Wilson, who was teaching Constitutional Law there at the time, was among his professors. After graduating in October 1897, Hylan clerked for Long Island City attorney James T. Olwell. He prepared himself in two and a half years. The earliest bar exam he could take was in Syracuse, but immediately before he was set to take the exam, he was involved in a near accident with the railroad's supervisor. Hylan said that it was the supervisor's fault, but nonetheless, he was fired. Even so, the privileges of his membership in the Brotherhood of Locomotive Engineers enabled him to travel to Syracuse at no charge, and he passed the bar exam.

Law and politics

Law career
Hylan learned that law practices required startup cash, so he mortgaged the farm again to raise $500. With that sum, he set up an office on the corner of Gates Avenue and Broadway in Bushwick. He made $24 his first month, but gradually built up a good civil litigation practice. He soon formed a partnership with Harry C. Underhill, an attorney who had written a treatise on evidence and would go on to write on other practice topics. Underhill did the office work, while Hylan was the trial lawyer. The firm occasionally received positive local publicity, such as the time when they obtained a ruling that the Brooklyn Heights Railroad Company had to offer free transfers at all junctions. Hylan litigated small civil cases and family law matters. He had little work in the police courts and "never cared for that branch of the law."

After eight years in the courts of Brooklyn, he was respected enough to begin getting appointments within the power of local judges. Hylan had higher ambitions, so he began making the kind of connections expected of someone considering a run for higher office. One connection he made, albeit by accident, was John H. McCooey, the future Brooklyn Democratic Party boss; they met when McCooey was a postal clerk and Hylan was sending money orders to his parents for interest payments on the family farm's mortgage. Hylan would remain grateful for the kindness McCooey showed him, and they remained friends thereafter. 

Other contacts were made by constant attendance at local organizations, political and otherwise. In addition to his union membership, which he kept up even when he was mayor, he was a member of the Foresters of America, the Broadway Board of Trade, the Twenty-eighth Ward Taxpayer Association, and he began working his way up the local Democratic club.

Politics and judgeships

Hylan emerged from obscurity in Brooklyn Democratic politics during the citywide elections of 1903, a campaign during which several internal Democratic power struggles worked themselves out. In Manhattan Charles Francis Murphy had recently replaced Richard Croker as head of the Tammany machine. Murphy, who had become independently wealthy from a trucking company which leased docks from the city and rented them to shipping companies, fixed his goal as Tammany chief to extend Tammany influence to all the boroughs and then beyond. He decided to dislodge Fusionist mayor Seth Low by running George B. McClellan Jr., son of the Civil War general who had run against Lincoln in 1864.

The move was unpopular in Brooklyn, whose leaders believed that McClellan would hurt down-ticket Brooklyn candidates; they concluded that running McClellan likely would cost them the district attorney and sheriff's offices, not to mention borough and judicial races. Some observers believed that it was Murphy's intention, despite the risk of lost votes in Brooklyn, as long as he could cut off the Kings County party's independent base of patronage. Murphy's highhandedness rankled others as well. At the City Committee meeting on September 18, party leaders from Queens, the Bronx and Richmond joined Brooklyn in expressing their concern. 

Independent Manhattan Democrats also objected to Murphy's action, including the Greater New York Democracy, which decided for the Fusion ticket, and former Tammany police chief Bill Devery, who decided to run for Mayor himself. Even several Tammany chiefs questioned the wisdom of the McClellan choice. Brooklyn party leader Hugh McLaughlin decided to test Murphy's hold over the outer boroughs and gave an interview promising to oppose Murphy's nominee at the city convention.

At the Democratic City Committee meeting on September 24, Murphy defied Brooklyn leaders to take the fight over McClellan to the Convention the next week, knowing that Tammany controlled a majority of the delegates. With a view to sowing confusion among the Fusionists, Murphy without consultation outside of Tammany proposed adding two Fusion candidates to the ticket—Edward M. Grout for Controller and Charles V. Fornes for President of the Board of Aldermen. The proposed nomination of two Fusion candidates by Tammany so disturbed the non-Tammany Democrats that, after much behind-the-scenes scheming, McLaughlin announced a complex plan the day before the convention to either dislodge McClellan from the ticket and Murphy from Tammany in the process or provide an anti-Tammany Democratic ticket that would run against Tammany's ticket.

The convention took place on October 1, 1903 at Carnegie Hall. At the beginning it looked as if the Kings County delegation could engineer a stampede against the Tammany ticket. Brooklyn Assistant District Attorney Martin W. Littleton led the charge, looking directly at Murphy in front of him and delivering a blistering speech scoring Tammany "treachery" for selecting Democratic "traitor" Grout. Robert H. Elder followed him, placing in nomination Julian D. Fairchild in Grout's place and reminded the convention that Grout had been a Republican and left the Brooklyn Democrats because of their association with Tammany.

Littleton rose again to remind the delegates that Grout once called Tammany a "stench in his nostrils." The "excitement reached a climax" when one Tammany leader broke with Murphy against Grout causing "wild applause." Murphy and the Tammany leaders sat through the abuse, smiling, and in the end the Brooklyn Democrats were routed by the near unanimous Tammany vote.  While the Kings County delegation under the leadership of state senator Patrick H. McCarren made show of unity by moving the unanimous nomination of McClellan when its nominee was defeated, a similar motion for Grout and Fornes, however, was "howled down."

The next day at the Brooklyn Democratic headquarters in the auction room on Willoughby Street, all talk of McLaughlin's plan for an opposition ticket to Tammany's had ceased. If McClellan won the mayoralty, all Brooklyn patronage would go through him and Tammany. While Brooklyn maintained its objection to Grout and Fornes, that did little good for the Brooklyn party unless McClellan lost, but McCarren and the rest at the Convention eventually endorsed McClellan. As one Democrat put it:  "Tammany's coming to Brooklyn sure and the Old Man [McLaughlin] will take his medicine." For McLaughlin whether he would remain in charge of the Brooklyn Democrats now depended on his former subordinate McCarren. McCarren, however, used the occasion to take over the Brooklyn organization, and in the turmoil Hylan made his first move for party advancement.

Mayor of New York City

Hylan defeated the reformer John Purroy Mitchel in the four-sided 1917 mayoral election, restoring the power of Tammany at City Hall. Hylan was the first Democratic candidate to obtain a significant portion of the African American voter base. He easily won re-election in 1921 but was defeated for re-nomination in 1925 by State Senator James J. "Jimmy" Walker. Walker later appointed Hylan to the municipal judiciary.

As mayor, Hylan railed against "the interests" and put in motion the building of the Independent Subway System, which would later become part of the New York City Subway. On December 30, 1925, Hylan resigned from office one day before the end of his term in order to assure his eligibility for a $4,205 annual pension from the city. The  Hylan Boulevard in Staten Island was renamed for him in 1923 over the protests of his political opponents.

Hylan developed a reputation for not being exceptionally intelligent or well-spoken. According to Robert Moses, Hylan went through most of a mayoral campaign using just one stump speech: a call to keep the five-cent subway fare in place.  He asked for Moses' help in preparing another, and Moses obliged.  The first time Hylan tried to deliver the new speech, he reached the climax—a Revolutionary War-inspired "I call for the spirit of 1776"—but rather than closing out on a high note, Hylan missed the context and read out the number's digits, saying, "I call for the spirit of one-seven-seven-six."

In another story recounted about Hylan's supposed lack of intelligence and articulateness, his successor Jimmy Walker appointed Hylan as judge of the Queens Children's Court.  When journalist Alva Johnston asked Walker why he would appoint a rival to a judgeship, Walker quipped, "The children now can be tried by their peer."

Famous speech
Hylan's most famous statement against "the interests" was the following speech, made in 1922, while he was the sitting Mayor of New York City:

Death
Hylan died of a heart attack at the age of 67 on January 12, 1936, at his home in Forest Hills, Queens.

In popular culture
In the first issue of The New Yorker (February 21, 1925), a humor piece on the history of New York refers to John F. Hylan as "Jonef Hylan":

The next great figure in the early legends of New York is that of Jonef Hylan.  Hylan, in all probability, was not a real person; but it is impossible to understand New York without giving careful study to the Hylan myth.  In many respects, it resembles the Sun Myth of other great civilizations; for his head was as a head of flame, and he rose early each morning from beyond the East River, bringing light into all the dark places and heat into the sessions of the Board of Estimate.  The populace called their Sun God "Red Mike"; but in the frenzy of their devotions, they simply yelled "Ra! Ra!"

He is then characterized as a "Champion of the People versus the Interests", which are "not people". Satan, it says, was behind the Interests, but William Randolph Hearst was behind Hylan, "and that evened things up".

In the April issue of The New Yorker the same year, a cartoon by Alfred Frueh shows firefighters carrying people from a burning building wearing placards with notices such as "This lucky man is being rescued by Mayor Hylan's firemen."

See also
List of mayors of New York City
Abridged recording of Mayor Hylan reading his acceptance speech on renomination as Mayor in 1921 for the General Phonograph Corporation.

Notes and references

Notes

References

Further reading

External links

 Digitized photographs of John F. Hylan (1918-1922) from the NYPD Annual Reports, Lloyd Sealy Library Digital Collections

1868 births
1936 deaths
20th-century American politicians
American people of French descent
American people of Irish descent
American people of Welsh descent
Burials at St. John's Cemetery (Queens)
Mayors of New York City
New York (state) Democrats
New York Law School alumni
People from Bushwick, Brooklyn
People from Forest Hills, Queens
People from Greene County, New York
Catholics from New York (state)